Ryan Steele (born August 3, 1990) is an American dancer and actor. He has performed on Broadway and in other performances, as well as in film and television. He is best known for the role of Specs in the 2012 musical Newsies.

Early life and education 
Steele was born and raised in Walled Lake, Michigan where he lived with his parents, and his brother and sister. The entire Steele family had taken dance classes; his mother in a 'moms dance class', his father in a 'dads dance class' along with both of his siblings. He started dancing at the age of five  and instantly fell in love with it.

During elementary and high school he received training from a number of dance programs, including The Juilliard School. In his last few years of high school, Steele was training intensively in Ballet, focusing on a career in concert dance. Steele did not attend university, opting to take a year off and try out for different dance companies. In that year he got a contract with a ballet company in Texas. That year Steele also attended an open call for the 2009 revival of West Side Story, thus was the beginning of his career.

Steele is openly gay and his family has always been supportive of his career and sexuality. He was in a relationship with fellow Broadway actor Matt Doyle for two years.

Career

Theatre 
After high school Steele opted to take the year off and try out for different dance companies. In that year he got a contract with a ballet company in Texas. That year Steele also attended an open call for the 2009 revival of West Side Story where he got the part, leading him to pursue the role of Baby John. Steele was with the cast from opening night on March 19, 2009 to closing night on January 2, 2011.

Following West Side Story, Steele joined the cast of Newsies at the Paper Mill Playhouse in New Jersey, where he originated the role of Specs. When Newsies moved to Broadway, Steele reprised the role of Specs. Along with the role Steele also was the original dance captain for the musical. Steele was with the cast of Newsies from opening on March 29, 2012 until February 3, 2013 when he left to be part of the original cast of Matilda the Musical, from opening on April 11, 2013 until October 6, 2013.

Steele was also a member of the Billy Elliot the Musical cast, joining as a replacement swing and understudy on and off between January 4, 2011 and January 8, 2012.

Film and television 
Steele's first film is Five Dances, written and directed by Alan Brown. Steele had the lead role, playing 18-year-old Chip, a young dancer who moved to New York City to pursue intensive ballet training.

In December 2014, Steele appeared as Curly, a Lost Boy, in NBC's Peter Pan Live! where he met his partner, Charlie Williams.

Steele was a dancer in the 2015 Academy Awards ceremony.

Steele also appeared as an ensemble member in the TV series Smash as well as in the pilot episode of The Miraculous Year.

Filmography

Film

Television

Theater

Awards and nominations

References 

American gay actors
LGBT dancers
LGBT people from Michigan
American male musical theatre actors
1990 births
Living people
21st-century American male actors
Male actors from Michigan
People from Walled Lake, Michigan